HD 135438 is a K-type giant star in the northern constellation of Boötes.  With an apparent magnitude of 6.0, it lies about 650 light years away.

HD 135438 has a magnitude 9.36 companion at an angular separation of  along a position angle of 158° (as of 2012).  Gaia Data Release 3 parallaxes indicate that the visual companion is an unrelated background star.

References

External links
 HR 5674
 CCDM J15141+3147
 Image HD 135438

Boötes
135438
Double stars
K-type giants
074561
5674
Durchmusterung objects